Abuel is a surname. Notable people with the surname include:

Janet Abuel (born 1971), Filipino lawyer, accountant, and public servant
Louise Abuel (born 2003), Filipino actor and model
Tommy Abuel (born 1942), Filipino actor

See also
Abel (surname)

Surnames of Philippine origin